Keshinro Ololade (born 17 March 1995), known professionally as Lil Kesh, is a Nigerian singer and rapper. He rose to limelight after releasing the hit single "Shoki".

Early life and education 
Ololade was born and raised in Bariga, an area in Lagos State. He attended Stockbridge College for his primary and secondary education, and then proceeded to the University of Lagos, where he studied Linguistics. Later, he moved on to the National Open University and studied Mass Communication online.

Career 
He began, his musical career in 2012. When,  he started rapping among his colleagues in Bariga. Shortly after, he released "Lyrically", a debut single which the song went viral within Nigerian universities. Aftermath, Lil Kesh signed a contract with Yahoo Boy No Laptop Nation popularly, known as YBNL Nation (YBNL) is an independent record label founded by Olamide Adedeji in 2012. Under this label, Kesh dropped series of hit singles like Shoki, Efejoku, Gbese, e.t.c and released his debut studio album, "YAGI". Subsequently in 2014, Lil Kesh released a hit single "Shoki". Shoki topped, several musical charts and brought him to limelight. As a result of this musical production, he was nominated for several awards and won two. In 2015, he was nominated for Best New Act at the 2015 Nigeria Entertainment Awards. As a recording artist affiliated with YBNL Nation. Then in 2016, after the expiration of his contract with YBNL, Lil Kesh has established his own record label YAGI Records (an acronym for "Young And Getting It") and is managed by Massive Management team,  a marketing and event management  company. On 17 March 2016. Lil Kesh released, his debut studio album Young And Getting It (Y.A.G.I) through YBNL Nation It was produced by Young John, and Pheelz Vocals were from Phyno, Ycee, Wale, Patoranking, Adekunle Gold, Davido,Viktoh, Olamide and Chinko Ekun It incorporates hip hop and rap genre. It has four singles – Lyrically (2014), Efejoku (2015), Is it because I love You (2015), and Ibile (2016).

Artistry 
The versatility  and musical style of Lil Kesh is similar to that of Olamide, who raps and sings in his local dialect. However, he was criticized for using too much profanity and for failing to find the right balance in his songs' lyrics. In an interview with Naij, he said, "they are singles not an album, I know the kind of market am directing my songs to, I am from the streets, I know what the people from the street want to listen to...they should wait for my album that is expected to drop towards the end of the year. I have very positive songs".

Discography

Studio albums

Selected singles

Awards and nominations

References

External links 

1995 births
Living people
People from Lagos
People from Lagos State
Musicians from Lagos State
Rappers from Lagos
Nigerian male singer-songwriters
YBNL Nation artists
Yoruba-language singers
University of Lagos alumni
21st-century Nigerian  male singers
Residents of Lagos